Lynn Graham (born November 3, 1947) is an American former track and field athlete who specialized in the shot put. Graham was the Pan American Games gold medalist in 1971. She won six national titles in the shot put and one in the discus.

Career
Graham, born in an African-American family in California grew up in Los Angeles. Her talent for throwing events was quickly identified and a sixteen-year-old Graham was runner-up at the 1964 United States Olympic Trials and also third at the national Amateur Athletic Union meet. At the age of seventeen she won national titles in both the shot put and discus throw at the USA Outdoor Track and Field Championships. After 1965 she decided to focus mainly on the shot put instead, as it was her best event.

She defended her shot put national title in 1966 and claimed her first indoor American title at the USA Indoor Track and Field Championships the following year. Outdoors, she was beaten at the 1967 nationals by Maren Seidler, but still she was selected to represent the United States at the 1967 Pan American Games held in Winnipeg. Still a teenager, Graham claimed her first major international medal – a silver – behind Canada's
Nancy McCredie, who had entered as the defending champion.

Graham's teenage shot put exploits remained the best of the nation for over two decades, with her national high school record lasting until 1990, when it was bettered by Stephanie Wadsworth. In 1968 Graham aimed to make her first Olympic team, but losses to Seidler at both the Olympic trials event and the national championships meant her younger rival was selected instead.

Graham moved around clubs after this period, going from a Los Angeles-based club to the Millbrae Lions, then the Fresno Elans. This coincided with the best years of her career. Her best international results followed at the inaugural 1969 Pacific Conference Games in Tokyo she was silver medallist behind Barbara Poulsen of New Zealand. The greatest win of her shot putting career came at the 1971 Pan American Games in Cali, Colombia.

Graham's last year of high level competition was in 1972. Aiming yet again for the Olympic team, her perennial rival Maren Seidler emerged the better thrower and defeated her at both the Olympic trials and national championships.

International competitions

National titles
USA Outdoor Track and Field Championships
Shot put: 1965, 1966, 1969, 1970, 1971
Discus throw: 1965
USA Indoor Track and Field Championships
Shot put: 1967

References

Living people
1947 births
Track and field athletes from Los Angeles
American female shot putters
African-American female track and field athletes
Pan American Games gold medalists for the United States
Pan American Games medalists in athletics (track and field)
Athletes (track and field) at the 1967 Pan American Games
Athletes (track and field) at the 1971 Pan American Games
American female discus throwers
Pan American Games silver medalists for the United States
Medalists at the 1967 Pan American Games
Medalists at the 1971 Pan American Games
21st-century African-American people
21st-century African-American women
20th-century African-American sportspeople
20th-century African-American women
20th-century African-American people